The City of Lethbridge, Alberta, Canada has over 30 neighbourhoods.

Downtown

Downtown Lethbridge strictly speaking is bordered by the Oldman River valley on the west, Crowsnest Trail and the CPR rail line on the north, Stafford Drive (9 Street) on the east and 6 Avenue on the south. It is not very large and contains very little in neighbourhood structure. It is, however, home to Chinatown, a two block area on 2 Avenue, west of Galt Gardens.

The downtown core is also the commercial centre of the city, hosting most of the city's banks and several accounting and law practices, including national firms.

It also serves as a transportation hub. Whoop-up Drive, the busiest roadway in Lethbridge, connects West Lethbridge to downtown. Scenic Drive also provides downtown with a connection to the United States via Highway 4 and the Lethbridge County Airport via Highway 5. Downtown also has two connections to the Crowsnest Highway, which provides direct access to British Columbia and indirect access to Calgary and Saskatchewan.  The city's main transit terminal is downtown also; half of the city's bus routes converge on 4 Avenue.

Neighbourhoods outside city centre by quadrant

Lethbridge is split into three geographical areas: north, south and west. West Lethbridge is separated from the other two by the Oldman River. North and South Lethbridge are separated by the Crowsnest Highway and the CPR rail line.

North Lethbridge

The north side (pop. 24,514) was originally populated as a result of numerous coal mines in the area, and is home to multiple industrial parks.

 Hardieville (former hamlet annexed in 1978)
 BlackWolf
 Legacy Ridge
 Park Meadows
 Senator Buchanan/Dave Elton
 St. Edwards
 Staffordville (a separate village until 1913)
 Westminster
 Winston Churchill
 Uplands

West Lethbridge

The newest of the three areas, West Lethbridge (pop. 29,673) is home to the University of Lethbridge. The bulk of the city's growth since the early 1990s has been on the west side. It also has the youngest population of the three.

 Benton Crossing
 Copperwood
 Heritage Heights
 Garry Station
 Indian Battle Heights
 Mountain Heights
 Paradise Canyon
 Ridgewood Heights
 Riverstone
 Sunridge
 Varsity Village
 West Highlands

South Lethbridge

South Lethbridge (pop. 29,773) is the commercial heart of the city, and has the oldest population of the three areas. It contains the downtown core, as well as the bulk of retail and hospitality establishments. Lethbridge College and the city's main arena, the ENMAX Centre are also located here.

 Chinook Heights
 Fairmont Park
 Fleetwood/St. Patrick's
 Glendale
 Hamilton
 Henderson Lake
 Lakeview
 London Road
 Redwood
 Scenic Heights
 Southgate
 Tudor Estates
 Victoria Park

See also
Lethbridge (main article)

External links
 Area Structure Plans
 Neighbourhood maps

References